Di komunistishe shtime ('The Communist Voice') was a Yiddish language newspaper published from Odessa between 1919 and 1921. Its frequency of publishing was irregular, alternating between daily and weekly. It was founded in early 1919 as the organ of the Odessa Committee of the Komfarband (Jewish Communist Union). Later it became the organ of the Jewish Section of the Odessa City Committee of the Communist Party (bolsheviks) of Ukraine. Published in the midst of the Russian Civil War, times of great scarcity of printing paper, Komunistishe shtime was printed on old postal paper.

During its initial phase Komunistishe shtime was edited by S. Epstein and A. Chemerinsky. Later the editing was managed by a collective team. As of 1921 it had a circulation of around 800. Komunistishe shtime was closed down in 1921. It was one of the publications that didn't survive the new policy imposed by the Sovnarkom in 1921 that newspapers had to be self-financing. 18 issues of Komunistishe shtime are kept at the National Library of Russia.

References

Jews and Judaism in Odesa
Publications established in 1919
Publications disestablished in 1921
Mass media in Odesa
Secular Jewish culture in Ukraine
Yiddish communist newspapers
Yiddish culture in Ukraine
Newspapers published in the Soviet Union